Miroslav Dujmović (born 19 October 1978) is a Bosnian-Herzegovinian retired footballer.

International career
He made his debut for Bosnia and Herzegovina in a July 2001 friendly match against Iran, in which he scored a goal. It remained his sole international appearance.

International goals
Scores and results list Bosnia and Herzegovina's goal tally first.

References

1978 births
Living people
People from Bihać
Croats of Bosnia and Herzegovina
Association football forwards
Bosnia and Herzegovina footballers
Bosnia and Herzegovina international footballers
NK Zagreb players
NK Hrvatski Dragovoljac players
NK Široki Brijeg players
NK Jedinstvo Bihać players
Croatian Football League players
Premier League of Bosnia and Herzegovina players
Austrian Regionalliga players
First League of the Federation of Bosnia and Herzegovina players
Bosnia and Herzegovina expatriate footballers
Expatriate footballers in Croatia
Bosnia and Herzegovina expatriate sportspeople in Croatia
Expatriate footballers in Austria
Bosnia and Herzegovina expatriate sportspeople in Austria